The Bloc of National Minorities ((BMN; , ; , ; ;) was a political party in the Second Polish Republic, representing a coalition of various ethnic minorities in Poland, primarily Ukrainians, Belarusians, Jews and Germans.

Overview
The Bloc was co-founded by Yitzhak Gruenbaum, a Polish-Jewish politician. It was formed on 17 August 1922 at a conference in Warsaw. Its united electoral committee consisted of three representatives each from Belarusians, Jews, Germans and Ukrainians (except for natives of Eastern Galicia who boycotted the elections).

BMN took part in the 1922 Polish legislative election, 1928 Polish legislative election and 1930 Polish legislative election, doing very well in the 1922 elections (19.5% and the second largest party) and 1928 elections (14% and the third largest party). In 1922 the bloc received the most votes in Volhynia, Polesia, and Chelm lands. On its party list there were elected 66 sejm representatives and 22 senators. In 1928 the bloc consisted of the Ukrainian National Democratic Alliance (UNDO), Ukrainian Peasant Union, Zionist organizations "Mizrahi" and "Hitachdut" (Unity) and few Belarusian and German groups. During the 1928 elections, the bloc earned 55 mandates to the Sejm and 21 to the Senate.

In 1930 elections which were considered not free, it fared poorly (3% and the ninth largest party). In the political shakedown following the 1930 elections, the Bloc was dissolved.

In the Second Polish Republic, ethnic minorities constituted 1/3 of total population.

Notable members

Belarusians
 Branisłaŭ Taraškievič
 Jan Stankievič
 Adam Stankievič

Germans
 Heinrich Greitzer
 Adolf Rause
 Karl Wilhelm Lutticher

Jews
Yitzhak Gruenbaum
Jakub Wygodzki
Noach Pryłucki
Apolinary Hartglas
Jakub Lejb Mincberg

Ukrainians
 Volodomyr Turchyniv
 Oleksii Sorydychiv
 Oleksander Syntyvich

References

1922 establishments in Poland
1930 disestablishments in Poland
Defunct political parties in Poland
Ethnic minorities
Ethnicity in politics
Federalist parties
German diaspora in Europe
Jewish Polish history
Jewish political parties
Multiculturalism
Political parties disestablished in 1930
Political parties established in 1922
Political parties of minorities in Poland
Regionalist parties
Second Polish Republic
Ukrainian political parties in Poland